Roger Stirn (6 March 1915 – 6 October 1971) was a Swiss fencer. He competed in the team foil event at the 1948 Summer Olympics.

Outside of fencing, Stirn was an archer and member of the Noble Exercise of the Bow in his native Geneva, holding the title of Chevalier. He died on 6 October 1971 after a long illness, aged 56.

References

External links
 

1915 births
1971 deaths
Swiss male fencers
Olympic fencers of Switzerland
Fencers at the 1948 Summer Olympics